The Golden Dome Athletic Center  in Newark, New Jersey is the hub of Rutgers–Newark athletics and teams, the Scarlet Raiders. It is located at 42 Warren Street between Downtown and University Heights. Built in 1977, it seats 2,000. The facility includes two gyms, five outdoor tennis courts, four racquetball courts, an exercise/dance studio and a 25-yard, eight-lane pool. 

Alumni Field across the street is the venue for NCAA baseball, softball and soccer games. Soccer and softball games are held on Alumni Field.  Rutgers–Newark baseball team plays at Bears & Eagles Riverfront Stadium

See also
 Fleisher Center
 List of college athletic programs in New Jersey
 History of sports in Newark, New Jersey
 Sports in New Jersey

References

External links 
 Rutger-Newark Athletics
 Wikimapia

Rutgers University buildings
Sports venues in Newark, New Jersey
Indoor arenas in New Jersey
Sports venues completed in 1977
1977 establishments in New Jersey